The Milk Train Doesn't Stop Here Anymore (1963) is a play in a prologue and six scenes, written by Tennessee Williams. He told John Gruen in 1965 that it was "the play that I worked on longest," and he premiered a version of it at the Festival dei Due Mondi in Spoleto, Italy, in July 1962. Its first American production was in January 1963 on Broadway at the Morosco Theatre, starring Hermione Baddeley. Reviews of the play were poor, although a newspaper strike prevented them from reaching audiences; the play ran for only 69 performances.

Williams revised the script for a second production, giving it a kabuki framework, with two actors playing stagehands who comment on the play as it happens. This new production opened on January 1, 1964 at the Brooks Atkinson Theatre under the direction of Tony Richardson. It starred Tallulah Bankhead (the part had originally been written for and was loosely based on Bankhead) and Tab Hunter, with Marian Seldes. It ran for only five performances after again receiving very poor notices. The 2011 revival starring Olympia Dukakis was directed by Michael Wilson.

In 1968, the play was adapted by Williams into the film Boom!, co-starring Elizabeth Taylor and Richard Burton, and directed by Joseph Losey. The film was a disastrous vehicle for both stars.

Synopsis 
The play is set in Italy and centers on a dying, wealthy woman, Mrs. Flora Goforth, who catches a young man, Christopher Flanders, allegedly trespassing on her estate. Dialogue between the two makes up much of the play. As a character, Mrs. Goforth is in a position where under the traditions of classic drama she could be a Stoic, but she deliberately rejects the consolations of philosophy and chooses, instead, to affirm eroticism and mysticism.  Mrs. Goforth dies at the end of the play after making these affirmations as her definitive statement about Life.

References

External links 
 

1963 plays
American plays adapted into films
Plays by Tennessee Williams
Plays set in Italy